The Home of Truth is a New Thought denomination founded in San Francisco, California founded by Annie Rix Militz.

History 
In 1887, Annie Rix Milnz attended a class led by Emma Curtis Hopkins in her home city of San Francisco. Applying her metaphysical teachings, Rix claimed to have cured her own chronic headaches and deafness in one ear. Soon after she founded a New Thought bureau with classes, a bookstore, and more. Rix soon married and started traveling the country; the San Francisco center was operated by her sister, Harriet Hale Rix.

In the 1890s the bureau was renamed the "Home of Truth", and by 1903 there were eight Homes of Truth in the United States. The Homes of Truth attracted an almost exclusively female following.

The denomination published Master Mind magazine from 1911 to 1933.

References

External links 
 

New Thought denominations
Panentheism
Religious organizations established in 1887
Religious organizations based in the United States
1887 establishments in California